Božidar Finka (19 December 1925 – 17 May 1999) was a Croatian linguist, lexicographer and member of the Croatian Academy of Sciences and Arts

Life and education 
Božidar Finka was born in Sali on 19 December 1925. In 1947 he finished high school in Split. In 1960 he graduated in Slavic Studies with the dissertation "Dugootočki Čakavski govori". Finka spent most of his scientific career working at the Institute of Croatian Language and Linguistics, serving as its director from 1973–77. He was a full member of the Croatian Academy of Sciences and Arts since 1988.

Works 
Finka's most significant work was in the fields of Croatian and Slavic dialectology and toponymy. With Stjepan Babić and Milan Moguš, he co-authored Hrvatski pravopis ("Croatian Orthography", 1st ed. 1971).

Sources

 
 Finka, Božidar at enciklopedija.hr 

1925 births
1999 deaths
People from Sali, Croatia
Linguists from Croatia
Croatian lexicographers
Dialectologists
Faculty of Humanities and Social Sciences, University of Zagreb alumni
Members of the Croatian Academy of Sciences and Arts
20th-century linguists
20th-century lexicographers